Jason Todd is a character appearing in comic books and media published by DC Comics.

Jason Todd may also refer to:

 Jason Todd Ipson
 Jason Todd Ready
 "Jason Todd" (Titans episode)
 Jason Todd (Titans character)